Schizocypris altidorsalis, common name gorgak, is a species of cyprinid in the genera Schizocypris. It inhabits Sistan, Iran. It is classified as "least concern" by the IUCN Red List.

References

Cyprinid fish of Asia
IUCN Red List least concern species
Fish of Iran